Cyathostemon gracilis is a member of the family Myrtaceae endemic to Western Australia.

It is found in a small area on the south coast in the Great Southern region of Western Australia near Ravensthorpe.

References

gracilis
Plants described in 2014
Taxa named by Barbara Lynette Rye
Taxa named by Malcolm Eric Trudgen